Rev. Philip L. Boroughs, S.J., (born in Vancouver, British Columbia) is an American Jesuit, academic and university administrator. Boroughs was unanimously selected as the incoming 32nd President of the College of the Holy Cross on May 6, 2011. He took office on January 9, 2012, when Rev. Michael C. McFarland, S.J., who had served as President of Holy Cross since 2000, stepped down. He served in the role until the end of the 2020-21 academic year, when he was succeeded by Vincent Rougeau.

Biography

Career
Boroughs has worked as an academic administrator and faculty member at both Gonzaga University and Seattle University.

V.P. of Georgetown University
In 2003, Boroughs was selected as the Vice President for Mission and Ministry at Georgetown University in Washington D.C. Boroughs' responsibilities as vice president included fundraising, the creation of religious programs to serve the Georgetown community and the promotion of Georgetown University's Jesuit and Roman Catholic identities.

Under Boroughs, the renovations of Georgetown University's Dahlgren Chapel of the Sacred Heart were begun. The school also launched the construction project for the forthcoming Calcagnini Contemplative Center. Plans were also initiated to add Jewish, Muslim and Eastern religion worships spaces within Georgetown University's Leavey Center. Each of these projects was scheduled for completion after Boroughs left Georgetown to become President of the College of the Holy Cross.

President of the College of the Holy Cross
In February 2011, College of the Holy Cross President Rev. Michael C. McFarland, S.J., announced his intention to step down as president after more than eleven years as the head of the college. Holy Cross' thirty-five member board of trustees launched a nationwide search for a new president. Boroughs, who had previously served on Holy Cross' board for three years, applied for the position. According to a spokesperson for Holy Cross, Boroughs was the only candidate to visit the school's campus during the selection process.

Boroughs was unanimously elected as Holy Cross' incoming 32nd president by the board on May 6, 2011. He became President on January 9, 2012, upon McFarland's departure.

In September 2020, Boroughs announced his planned resignation effective June 30, 2021. On February 10, 2021, Holy Cross announced that it has selected Vincent D. Rougeau, Dean of the Boston College Law School, as its 33rd president. Rougeau will be the first lay and first Black president in the history of the College.

References

20th-century American Jesuits
21st-century American Jesuits
Presidents of the College of the Holy Cross
American academic administrators
Georgetown University faculty
Gonzaga University faculty
Seattle University faculty
People from Seattle
People from Vancouver
Catholics from Washington (state)
Year of birth missing (living people)
Living people